Don Isaacs (July 23, 1919 – February 6, 1998) was an American sound editor. He won two Primetime Emmy Awards and was nominated for seven more in the category Outstanding Sound Editing.

Filmography 
 A Hatful of Rain (1957)
 The Three Faces of Eve (1957)
 No Down Payment (1957)
 Peyton Place (1957)
 The Bravados (1958)
 The Fly (1958)
 The Roots of Heaven (1958)
 Here Come the Jets (1959)
 Shoot Out at Big Sag (1962)
 Emperor of the North (1973)
 The Legend of Lizzie Borden (1975)
 Six Pack (1982)
 Kiss Me Goodbye (1982)
 The Buddy System (1984)
 Unfaithfully Yours (1984)
 Iron Eagle (1986)
 Summer Camp Nightmare (1986)
 Native Son (1986)
 Retribution (1987)
 Waxwork (1988)
 Mac and Me (1988)
 Blueberry Hill (1988)

References

External links 

1919 births
1998 deaths
Place of birth missing
American sound editors
Primetime Emmy Award winners